Canthon zuninoi is a species of Scarabaeidae or scarab beetles. It is found in Mexico.

References

External links

Insects of Mexico